Tarinee Datt Chataut is a politician from Nepal. He served as the Law, justice and parliamentary minister and Tourism, Civil Aviation and Culture minister of Nepal. He was the Chief Whip of Parliamentary Party of Nepali Congress. He was a central working committee member of Nepali Congress Party and served as Chief of Foreign Department and Training Department of the party. He is currently a Constituent Assembly member of Nepal.

References

See also
 Nepali Congress
 Kanchanpur

Nepali Congress politicians from Sudurpashchim Province
Nepal MPs 1991–1994
Nepal MPs 1999–2002
Members of the 2nd Nepalese Constituent Assembly